Tokyo's 1st district was a constituency of the House of Representatives in the Diet of Japan (national legislature). Between 1947 and 1993 it elected four, later three representatives by single non-transferable vote. It initially consisted of Tokyo's Chiyoda, Chūō, Minato, Shinjuku, Bunkyō and Taitō special wards. In the 1964 redistricting Chūō, Bunkyō and Taitō were split off to form the new 8th district.

It was represented by several influential political leaders in postwar Japan, namely right-wing Socialist Inejirō Asanuma, Communist Sanzō Nosaka and, after the lifting of SCAP Douglas MacArthur's purge and his recovery from a stroke, anti-mainstream conservative Ichirō Hatoyama. Later representatives included former Tokyo governor Seiichirō Yasui, construction minister Yūji Ōtsuka, JSP chairman Ichio Asukata, education minister Kaoru Yosano and Shimin League president and DPJ co-founder Banri Kaieda.

Summary of results during the 1955 party system

Elected Representatives

References 

Districts of the House of Representatives (Japan)
Politics of Tokyo